Oobu Joobu was a radio show created, directed and presented by Paul McCartney. It was described by McCartney as "wide-screen radio". The program aired in 1995 on the American radio network Westwood One and its name was inspired by a BBC production of Alfred Jarry's Ubu Cocu. Because the show's material included demos, rehearsals, live performances, and unreleased recordings of Paul McCartney, many of the programs have been bootlegged. Now, The Beatles Channel on Sirius XM often plays Oobu Joobu clips.

Shows

Show 1
Broadcast during the weekend of 27 May 1995.

 Oobu Joobu Intro – Unreleased McCartney track
 Take It Away – Studio outtake
 Talk About The Radioshow – Chat
 Biker Like An Icon – Soundcheck
 Oobu Joobu – Rehearsal
 Oobu Joobu / Good Rockin' Tonight – Partial/Chat
 Lucille – Paul & Little Richard versions edited together
 Little Richard's Story / Tutti Frutti – Little Richard
 Oobu Joobu / Cook of the House – Linda's recipe
 New Orleans / Oobu Joobu – Unreleased Linda McCartney song
 Oobu Joobu / I Wanna Be Your Man – Paul talks about 1st Rolling Stones' single
 I Wanna Be Your Man – Soundcheck at the Giant Stadium
 Oobu Joobu / Story About Paul's Father – Chat
 Flight of the Bumble Bee – Classical: Wynton Marsalis
 We Can Work It Out – Soundcheck/Rehearsal
 Oobu Joobu Superman Jingle / Reggae Story – Chat
 Butter Cup – Winston Scotland – 7" single.
 Ou Est Le Soleil? – Home recording & finished version
 Atlantic Ocean – Unfinished song (partial)
 A Fairy Tale – Bonus track: Paul at the piano telling a story to his children. Mid Seventies
 Welcome Back / About Alan Crowder – Jam
 Oobu Joobu / Don't Get Around Much Anymore – Studio outtake
 Papa's Got A Brand New Bag – James Brown
 They Call My Baby Baby – Soundcheck Jam
 Boil Crisis / Oobu Joobu Jingle – Part of an unreleased song from the rude corner
 C Moon – Rehearsal
 Put It There – Rehearsal
 My Dad – From TV Show, Chet Atkins
 Oobu Joobu Jingle / Paul About Buddy – Chat
 That'll Be The Day – Buddy Holly record
 It's Now Or Never – Jam
 Green Sleeves / Talk About Rainforests – Jeff Beck (partial) / Chat
 Once In A Lifetime – Talking Head record
 Cumberland Gap – Improvisation
 Chants – Two women from The Burundi Tribe
 Oobu Joobu Intro / Ebony And Ivory – Rehearsal with Stevie Wonder
 Oobu Joobu Outro / Credits / Tutti Frutti

Show 2
Broadcast during the weekend of 29 May 1995.

 Intro – Jingle
 Ain't That A Shame – Outtake
 Intro / I'm In Love Again – Fats Domino, Paul sings along
 Back In The U.S.S.R. – Studio outtake, probably from 1989
 Intro / Ain't She Sweet – Jonathan & Darlene Edwards
 Lovers That Never Were – Paul and Elvis Costello. Partial demo / regular
 This Sad Burlesque – Elvis Costello & The Brodsky Quartet
 Be-Bop-a-Lula – Soundcheck in Kansas City
 Intro / The Joker – Steve Miller Band
 Hey Jude – Rehearsal, mock version
 Linda's Recipe / Sugertime – Linda sings lead and Paul backing vocals
 Intro / Spies Like Us – Demo version
 Let 'Em In – Reggae version by Shinehead
 Can't Buy Me Love – Soundcheck

Show 3
Broadcast during the weekend of 10 June 1995.

 Intro Oobu Joobu – Includes chat
 I Love This House – Unfinished track with David Gilmour
 Knock On Wood – Eddy Floyd single
 Blue Moon Of Kentucky / Oobu Joobu Jingle – Mix of Monroe, Paul and Elvis versions / Chat
 We're Gonna Move / Oobu Joobu Jingle – Rehearsal
 Reggae Intro / No Sun Will Shine – Chat / Bob Marley single
 We Got Married – Demo
 Got To Get You Into My Life – Rehearsal
 Oobu Joobu / Radio Play – Chat / Fun
 Virginia Plain / Fun / Intro To Blackbird – Roxy Music single
 Blackbird – Chat / Rehearsal
 Linda's Recipe / Cook of the House – Linda's recipe / Chat
 White Coated Man – Linda McCartney's song outtake
 Welcome Back / Oobu Joobu Time / Introduction – Chat & Jam
 Singin' The Blues – Soundcheck in Toronto
 Happy Jack – The Who single
 Pete Townsend / Oobu Joobu Fun – Chat
 Rock Island Line – Rehearsal by Paul
 Oobu Joobu Closing Theme

Show 4
Broadcast during the weekend of 12 June 1995.

 Intro / Oobu Joobu – Intro jingle
 Love Mix – Unfinished song
 Stop, You Don't Know Where She Came From – Short demo from rude corner
 Intro / Tipitina – Song by Professor Longhair
 Fool on the Hill / Oobu Joobu Jingle – Tour rehearsal
 Intro / New Moon Over Jamaica – Mix of Paul's demo and Johnny Cash version
 Intro / Buladance – The Baki Tribe
 Bring It To Jerome – Soundcheck in Minneapolis
 Dance of the Cossacks – Nutcracker ballet by The Royal Phil. Orchestra
 Linda's Recipe / Cook of the House – Linda's Recipe
 You Know You Are Such An Incredible Thing – Jam session
 Fixing A Hole / Oobu Joobu Outro – Tour rehearsal
 Intro / I Lost My Little Girl – Soundcheck
 Gimme Some Loving – Spencer Davis Group single
 Comedy – Chat
 Let It Be – Mock version
 Let It Be – Rehearsal
 Oobu Joobu – Outro jingle

Show 5
Broadcast during the weekend of 19 June 1995.

 Intro / Welcome To Oobu Joobu – Chat / Jingle
 Looking For Changes – Soundcheck in Las Vegas
 Peace in the Neighbourhood – Soundcheck in Las Vegas
 Oobu Joobu Jingle / Hold A Candle To This – The Pretenders single
 Message of Chrissie Hynde – Chat
 Wildlife – Chat and Music
 Oobu Joobu Jingle / I Can See Clearly Now – Johnny Nash single
 Introduction To Mother's Nature Son – Chat
 Mother Nature Son – Soundcheck
 Off The Ground – Soundcheck
 Cook of the House / Linda's Recipe – Linda's Recipe
 Cow – Linda McCartney and Carla Lane
 How Many People – Rehearsal
 We All Stand Together – Original demo
 3 Oobu Joobu Introductions – Jingles

Show 6
Broadcast during the weekend of 26 June 1995.

 There's No Business Like Showbusiness / Oobu Joobu – Intro / Jingle
 Twenty Flight Rock – Rehearsal
 The Girl Can't Help It – Chat
 Summertime Blues – Eddy Cochran single
 Summertime – Soundcheck
 Reggae Tunes & Highlights – Rude corner / Studio
 Deacon Blues – Steely Dan single
 Drive My Car – Rehearsal
 Oobu Joobu Jingle / You Know My Name / Intro About Brian Jones – Chat / The Beatles track
 Cook of the House – Linda's recipe
 Wild Prairie – Paul and Linda outtake
 Doing It All Day Long – Film music
 Oobu Joobu – Chat
 Oobu Joobu / Introduction – Chat / Jingle
 Courtly Dancers – Julian Breem from Gloriana
 Give Us A Chord, Roy – Partial outtake from a rude corner
 Oh Mama, Eh Papa – Soundcheck
 Oobu Joobu Outro / The Sheik of Araby – Jingle

Show 7
Broadcast during the weekend of 3 July 1995.

 Intro / Oobu Joobu – Jingle
 Two Instrumental Tracks – From rude corner
 No I Never – Jam session
 Sneaking Up Behind You – Instrumental by The Brecker Brothers
 Oobu Joobu / Welcome Back – Chat
 Crackin' Up – Soundcheck
 Loui, Loui – Toots & The Maytells
 Daytime Nighttime Suffering – Wings' B-side
 Intro To Bill Haley – Chat
 Rock Around The Clock – Billy Haley & His Comets
 Intro To Fanclub Xmas Discs – Chat
 If I Ever See Another Banjo – Part of The Beatles Xmas flexi
 Introduction To Love in the Open Air – Chat
 Love in the Open Air – Family Way Soundtrack
 Cook of the House – Linda's recipe
 Hot Soup, Jam & Fools – Improvisation
 Midland Two Step – Dusee Cajun Band
 San Francisco Bay Blues – Soundcheck in Detroit
 After You've Gone – Demo from rude corner
 Oobu Joobu Outro – Jingle
 Yellow Submarine – Rehearsal

Show 8
Broadcast during the weekend of 10 July 1995.

 Intro / Oobu Joobu – Jingle
 Jet – Rehearsal
 Keep Under Cover – Demo & studio outtake with Stanley Clark
 Johnny B. Goode – Chuck Berry record
 Oobu Joobu / Get Out of My Way – Soundcheck in St. Louis
 Apology – Unknown artist, Jamaica
 Three Cool Cats – Rehearsal
 Don't Break The Promises – Demo and Eric Stewart's version
 Cook of the House – Linda's recipe (Get Sick Recipe)
 Peacocks – Unreleased song
 I've Just Seen A Face – Tour rehearsal
 Music For Glass Harmonica – Studio rehearsal
 Winedark Open Sea – Rehearsal
 Welcome To Oobu Joobu – Jingle

Show 9
Broadcast during the weekend of 17 July 1995.

 Intro / Oobu Joobu – Jingle
 Miss Ann – Soundcheck
 What's Going On – Marvin Gaye record
 Blackbird / Blue Moon of Kentucky – Mock version from rehearsal
 She's A Woman – Rehearsal
 Uh-Oh 7 – Desmond Dekker Compact Cassette
 Live And Let Die – Soundcheck
 S M A – Heather & Paul McCartney
 Mercury: The Planets Suite – London Philharmonic Orchestra
 Cut Across Shorty – Rehearsal
 Hi Heeled Sneakers – Rehearsal
 Oobu Joobu Intro – Jingle
 Riders on the Storm – Doors track
 Rough Ride – With Trevor Horn
 Cook Of The House / Oobu Joobu Jingle – Linda's recipe
 Bizarre Beatles Covers – 5 pieces
 Let Me Roll It – Soundcheck
 Oobu Joobu Jingle / Let It Be (Let It Lie) – Jingle

Show 10
Broadcast during the weekend of 24 July 1995.

 Intro / Oobu Joobu – Jingle
 Shake, Rattle And Roll – Long rehearsal
 Rock It – Herbie Hancock track
 Oobu Joobu Intro – Jingle
 Honey Don't – Soundcheck in Detroit
 If I Were Not Upon The Stage – Partial
 Intermezzo – Sound effects
 Like A Hurricane – Neil Young from Unplugged
 Motor Of Love / Oobu Joobu Outro Jingle – Rude studio demo
 Feel No Pain – Unknown artist, Jamaica
 Your School – Unreleased track, partial
 Get Back – Tour rehearsal
 Rodina: Song of the Fatherland – Woman's choir, Bulgaria
 Oobu Joobu – Outtake
 Oobu Joobu Intro / Cook Of The House – Linda's recipe
 Tomorrow's Light – Soundcheck in Detroit
 Three Pieces For Blues Band & Orchestra – William Rousseau
 Oobu Joobu Outro – Jingle
 Vocal Jam – Close harmony

Show 11
Broadcast during the weekend of 31 July 1995.

 Oobu Joobu Intro / Yesterday – Jingle / Mock version
 Matchbox – Rehearsal
 Blue Suede Shoes – Rehearsal
 Yesterday – Rehearsal / Mock version
 Oobu Joobu Jingle – Jingle
 Christmas Parade – Unknown reggae artist, Jamaica
 Yesterday – Boyz II Men, partial with commentaries
 Ballroom Dancing – Film take
 Ready Teddy / About Yesterday – Little Richard
 Rockestra Theme – With commentaries
 Yesterday – Tapped with Duane Eddie
 Cook of the House – Linda's recipe
 Garlic – From Mel Brooks' comedy routine "The 2000 Year old Man" 
 Little Daisy Root – Unreleased song
 3 Comments on Beatles and Yesterday – Speech
 Yesterday – Parody
 3 Comments on Beatles and Yesterday / Human League – Speech / Human League
 True Love Party – Carl Perkins and Paul McCartney
 Get It – Carl Perkins and Paul McCartney
 Paul and George Martin About Yesterday – Speech
 Yesterday – Paul live
 Oobu Joobu Outro – Jingle
 Yesterday – Parody

Show 12
Broadcast during the weekend of 7 August 1995.

 Oobu Joobu Intro – Jingle
 Mean Woman Blues – Soundcheck in Winnipeg
 When the Wind She Blows Cool – Jam in Winnipeg
 Comedy: Vivian Stanshall – Bonzo Dog (Doo-Dah) Band
 Outro – Intermezzo
 Oobu Joobu Jingle / Introduction Coming Up – Chat
 Coming Up – Outtake
 I Want Love – Reggae from Jamaica
 Another Day – Tour rehearsal
 Praying Mantis / Mambo Baby – 2 pieces from rude corner
 Oobu Joobu Jingle – Jingle
 Ann & Nancy Wilson About Wasting Water – Chat
 What About Love – Heart single
 Cook of the House / Linda's Recipe – Linda's recipe
 Sheep May Safely Graze / Paul About Meat – Go Veggie chat
 Instrumental Incl. Oobu Joobu Jingles – Another different instrumental
 Oobu Joobu Jingle – Jingle
 Beautiful Boy – John Lennon
 Oobu Joobu Jingle – Jingle
 Midnight Special – Tour rehearsal
 Oobu Joobu Outro – Jingle

Show 13
Broadcast during the weekend of 14 August 1995.

 Oobu Joobu Intro – Jingle
 Sweetest Little Show In Town – Rude Studios
 There's No Me Without You – The Manhattans
 Gonna Set His Town On Fire Tonight – Outtake
 Suzy Q – Jamaice reggae
 Mr. Froggie Went A-Courtin – Rehearsal
 Sunny Goodge Street – Donovan
 Soundcheck Song – Improvisation
 Every Night – Soundcheck in Cincinnati
 Oobu Joobu Jingle – Jingle
 Cook of the House / Linda's Recipe – Linda's recipe
 Endless Days And Lonely Nights – Linda McCartney
 Be A Vegetarian – Demo
 Ivory Madonna – UB 40
 Outro – Jingle
 Things We Said Today – Rehearsal
 Devoted To You – Everly Brothers
 Don't Let The Sun Catch You Cryin' – Rehearsal in Cincinnati
 Oobu Joobu Outro – Jingle
 The Entertainer – Film music

Show 14
Broadcast during the weekend of 19 August 1995.

 Intro – Oobu Joobu Jingle
 Lady Madonna – Soundcheck
 Bring It On Home To Me – Rehearsal
 (Sittin' On) The Dock of the Bay / Oobu Joobu Jingle – Otis Redding / Jingle
 Intro – Jingle
 Tequilla – Rehearsal
 Goldfinger – Reggae
 Intro to Song / Wanderlust – Demo
 Chinise Canon – World Music
 Intro Jingle / Cook of the House / Linda's Recipe – Linda's recipe
 Pull Away – Soundcheck
 Gymnopédies – Piano music by Pascale Rogier
 This One / Put It There – Two parodies
 Oobu Joobu Jingle – Jingle with Phil Collins
 Reason To Believe – Tim Hardin
 I Keep On Believing / Love Awake – Rude Studios
 Hey Jude – Rehearsal-Parody
 Hey Jude – Rehearsal
 Oobu Joobu Outro – Jingle
 Love Me Tender – Parody

Show 15
Broadcast during the weekend of 1–4 September 1995.

 Intro Jingle – Jingle
 Ain't That A Shame – Outtake
 I'm In Love Again – Fats Domino
 Back In The U.S.S.R. – Rehearsal
 We'll Be Right Back – Vocals
 New Moon Over Jamaica – Mix of Paul's demo and Johnny Cash version
 Introduction To Baki Tribe – Chants
 Bring It On Home To Me – Soundcheck in Minneapolis
 Good Rockin' Tonight / Introduction Little Richard – Acoustic jam
 Lucille / Lucille – Mixed together Paul's and Little Richard's versions
 Little Richard's Veg Story / Tutti Frutti – Little Richard
 Radio Play / Oobu Joobu Jingle – Fun intermezzo
 Cook of the House / Linda's Recipe – Linda's recipe
 New Orleans / Oobu Joobu Jingle – Unreleased Linda's song
 I Love This House – Unfinished track with David Gilmour
 Knock On Wood – Eddy Floyd single
 Blue Moon Of Kentucky Mix / Oobu Joobu Jingle – Mix of versions by Monroe, Paul and Elvis
 We're Gonna Move / Oobu Joobu Jingle – Rehearsal
 Ode To A Koala Bear – Bonus track: Alternate Take
 Oobu Joobu Intro / Yesterday – Jingle / Parody
 Love Mix – Unfinished song (partial)
 Stop You Don't Know Where She Came From – Demo from rude corner
 Tiptina – Professor Longhair
 Oobu Joobu / I Wanna Be Your Man – Paul talks about first Rolling Stones' single
 I Wanna Be Your Man – Soundcheck in New York City
 Oobu Joobu Jingle / Paul About His Dad – Chat
 Flight of the Bumble Bee – Marsalis
 We Can Work it Out – Soundcheck / rehearsal
 Hey Jude – Mock version
 Paul On Brian Wilson / God Only Knows – Partial
 God Only Knows – Elvis Costello & Brodsky Quartet
 One After 909 – Paul with Elvis Costello & Brodsky Quartet.
 Lady Madonna – Paul with Elvis Costello & Brodsky Quartet.
 Paul About Pet Sounds / You Still Believe In Me – Chat Paul / The Beach Boys
 Brian Wilson – Chat
 Orange Crate Art – Brian Wilson
 Brian Wilson At The Piano: Hey Jude / She's Leaving Home – Chatting and singing.
 San Francisco – Brian Wilson.
 Oobu Jobu's Thank You's – Summing up team.
 C'mon People – Soundcheck.
 Oobu Joobu Outro – Last jingle.

Singles
Tracks from the Oobu Joobu radio series also officially appeared on McCartney's Flaming Pie related singles.  The "songs" are mostly 10-minute jumbles of various demos, rehearsal, live, and unreleased recordings.
The "Young Boy" singles have:
"Oobu Joobu" (part 1) – 9:55 (UK CD 1)
"Oobu Joobu" (part 2) – 10:19 (UK CD 2)
"The World Tonight" singles have:
"Oobu Joobu" (part 1) – 9:55 (on the US version)
"Oobu Joobu" (part 3) – 9:48 (UK CD 1)
"Oobu Joobu" (part 4) – 7:06 (UK CD 2)
The "Beautiful Night" singles have:
"Oobu Joobu" (part 5) – 10:11 (UK CD 1) 
"Oobu Joobu" (part 6) – 9:15 (UK CD 2)

Part 1
"Oobu Joobu" (Part 1) contains:
"Some Folks Say Oobu" 
"Oobu Joobu Main Theme" 
Fun Packed Radio Show 
"I Love This House" 
"Clock Work" 
Paul talks about "Young Boy" 
"Oobu Joobu We Love You" 
"Oobu Joobu Main Theme"

Part 2
"Oobu Joobu" (Part 2) contains:
Wide Screen Radio 
"Oobu Joobu We Love You" 
"Oobu Joobu Main Theme" 
Brilliant, What's Next 
"Atlantic Ocean" 
Paul Reminisces 
"Bouree" 
"Oobu Joobu We Love You" 
"Oobu Joobu Main Theme"

Part 3
"Oobu Joobu" (Part 3) contains:
Intro chat 
"Oobu Joobu Main Theme" 
"Squid" 
Paul talks about "The World Tonight" 
Link 
"Oobu Joobu Main Theme"

Part 4
"Oobu Joobu" (Part 4) contains:
Intro chat 
"Oobu Joobu Main Theme" 
Link 
"Don't Break The Promise"
Paul talks about reggae 
Link 
"Oobu Joobu Main Theme"

Part 5
"Oobu Joobu" (Part 5) contains:
"And Now" 
"Oobu Joobu Main Theme" 
Beautiful Night Chat 
Paul and Ringo talk about "Beautiful Night" 
Ringo Chat 
"Beautiful Night (Flaming Pie Mix)" 
"Beautiful Night (Original Version)" 
Goodbyes 
"Oobu Joobu Main Theme"

Part 6
"Oobu Joobu" (Part 6) contains:
"This One" (jingle)
"Oobu Joobu Main Theme" 
"Oobu Joobu We Love You" 
Paul talks about Abbey Road 
"Strawberry Fields Forever" (Paul solo) 
Paul talks about Abbey Road 
"Come on Baby" 
Paul talks about Abbey Road 
"Come on Baby (contd.)" 
Paul ends chat about Abbey Road 
"Okay are You Ready" (jingle)
"Love Mix" 
"Widescreen Radio" (jingle)
Goodbye 
"Oobu Joobu Main Theme"

Ecology
On 14 May 1997, Best Buy released an album titled Oobu Joobu Ecology. The CD, an edited version of Show 5 in the radio series, was banded as one single 41:52 track. It was limited to 3000 copies.
 "Oobu Joobu Main Theme" Some spoken intro, followed by the theme – 2:05 
 "Looking for Changes" Soundcheck in Las Vegas – 2:41 
 "Peace in the Neighbourhood" Soundcheck in Las Vegas – 4:55 
  Ecological statement from Chrissie Hynde – 0:58 
 "Wild Life" Full original track – 5:18 
 "Mother Nature's Son" Soundcheck – 2:51 
 "Off the Ground" Soundcheck – 4:10 
 Linda's "Recipe Cook of the House", gives us, "Beefless Stroganoff" – 1:59 
 "Cow" Different version from the one on the "Wide Prairie" album – 3:51 
 "How Many People" Rehearsal segued into original track – 4:32 
 "We All Stand Together"  Original demo segued into original track – 2:42

References

Paul McCartney
American music radio programs
1995 radio programme debuts
Radio programmes about the Beatles